The 2023 Qatar Open (also known as 2023 Qatar ExxonMobil Open for sponsorship reasons) was the 31st edition of the Qatar Open, a men's tennis tournament played on outdoor hard courts. It was part of the ATP Tour 250 of the 2023 ATP Tour, and took place at the Khalifa International Tennis and Squash Complex in Doha, Qatar from 20 to 25 February 2023.

Champions

Singles 

  Daniil Medvedev def.  Andy Murray, 6–4, 6–4.

Doubles 

  Rohan Bopanna /  Matthew Ebden def.  Constant Lestienne /  Botic van de Zandschulp  6–7(5–7), 6–4, [10–6].

Points and prize money

Point distribution

Prize money 

*per team

Singles main-draw entrants

Seeds 

 1 Rankings are as of 13 February 2023.

Other entrants 
The following players received wildcards into the singles main draw:
  Andy Murray
  Abedallah Shelbayh 
  Fernando Verdasco

The following players received entry from the qualifying draw:
  Liam Broady 
  Damir Džumhur 
  Oleksii Krutykh 
  Alexandre Müller

The following player received entry as a lucky loser:
  Nikoloz Basilashvili

Withdrawals 
 Before the tournament
  Marin Čilić → replaced by  Márton Fucsovics
  Borna Ćorić → replaced by  Christopher O'Connell
  Jack Draper → replaced by  Nikoloz Basilashvili
  Rafael Nadal → replaced by  Ilya Ivashka

Doubles main-draw entrants

Seeds 

 1 Rankings are as of 13 February 2023.

Other entrants 
The following pairs received wildcards into the doubles main draw:
  Liam Broady /  Alexander Zverev 
  Malek Jaziri /  Mubarak Shannan Zayid

The following pair received entry as alternates:
  Patrik Niklas-Salminen /  Emil Ruusuvuori

Withdrawals 
  Jack Draper /  Jiří Lehečka → replaced by  Patrik Niklas-Salminen /  Emil Ruusuvuori
  Lloyd Harris /  Raven Klaasen → replaced by  Raven Klaasen /  Hunter Reese
  Kevin Krawietz /  Tim Pütz → replaced by  Tim Pütz /  Jan-Lennard Struff

References

External links 
 

Qatar Open
2023
Qatar Open
Qatar Open